Thai Dog may refer to:

Thai Bangkaew Dog
Thai Ridgeback

See also
List of dog breeds by country#Thailand